A fifth column is a group of people who undermine a larger group from within.

Fifth Column may also refer to:

Literature
The Fifth Column, a 1938 play by Ernest Hemingway, published in the volume The Fifth Column and the First Forty-Nine Stories
Fifth Column, a 1940 book by John Langdon-Davies

Film and television
The Fifth Column (film) (also known as Hinkerort zorasune), a 2010 short film set in Beirut
"The Fifth Column", episode 2.35 of the military science fiction series Exosquad
Fifth Column (V franchise), a subgroup of aliens in the V science fiction franchise
 (The Fifth Column), a German television series

Music
Fifth Column (band), an all-women post-punk band from Toronto, Canada
The 5ifth Column, an album by industrial rock band Acumen Nation
Fifth Column, a 2003 album by British musician U.N.P.O.C.
The 5th Column, official street team of the rock band AFI
Fifth Column Records, an industrial record label active in the 1990s

Others
Fifth Column (intelligence operation), a Second World War deception operation by MI5
The Fifth Column, a political and media gossip page in Ireland's Sunday Independent
Fifth Column (sotūn-e panjom), an editorial in the Iranian newspaper Jame'e written by Ebrahim Nabavi
The 5th Column, a fictional Nazi group in the City of Heroes MMORPG computer game
The Fifth Column Podcast, a libertarian-leaning podcast hosted by Kmele Foster, Michael C. Moynihan, Matt Welch.

See also
Sixth Column, a 1941 science fiction novel by Robert A. Heinlein